Smile is the fifth studio album by Japanese singer-songwriter Eve. It was released on February 12, 2020, by Toy's Factory. The album consists of thirteen tracks and was supported by three singles: "Yamiyo", "Raison d’être" and "Shirogane". The album also has a limited edition with the same title.

Background and release 
This was Eve's first release since his last album titled Otogi a year earlier. The album teaser video was released on YouTube on February 9, 2020. The singer released the song "Kokoroyohou" digitally as a pre-release on January 31, 2020.

The album was released on February 23, 2020, in several online music stores. The limited version comes in a special box with a DVD containing four music videos, a booklet, a collection of single jackets and a zingai card. In addition, the possibility of pre-booking tickets for the "Eve LIVE Smile" presentation was included.

Promotion 
Eve planned to promote the album during his "Eve LIVE Smile" presentation, but it was postponed and cancelled due to the COVID-19 pandemic. Also, although the schedule was not officially announced, Eve said there was a plan to tour nationally from the summer through the autum of 2020.

Track listing

Charts

Sales

References 

2020 albums
Toy's Factory albums